The Matabeleland Tuskers is one of five Zimbabwean cricket franchises. They are a first-class cricket team, based in the Bulawayo Metropolitan and Matabeleland North area.  They play their home matches at Queens Sports Club in Bulawayo. They were formed in 2009, when the domestic game in Zimbabwean cricket was restructured.

History
In their first season, they suffered disappointing results, placing fourth in the Logan Cup, and failing to qualify for the final of either the one-day or Twenty20 competitions. The following season, they qualified for the final of the Logan Cup as league runners-up, and despite missing their best four batsmen in the final, defeated the Mountaineers by 18 runs to claim their first title. They defended their title the following year, winning five of their eight matches to clinch consecutive wins in the Logan Cup: the first team in the franchise-era to achieve the feat.

They won the 2016–17 Pro50 Championship, the domestic List A tournament.

Honours
 Logan Cup: 2
2010–11, 2011–12

Current squad
Players with international caps are listed in bold.

References

Zimbabwean first-class cricket teams